Woodland Acres may refer to:

 Woodland Acres, Grande Prairie County No. 1, Alberta
 Woodland Acres, Parkland County, Alberta
 Woodland Acres, Ontario, in Selwyn